Kelly Cagle (born August 22, 1974) is an American former professional soccer player who featured as a forward and midfielder and was a member of the United States women's national soccer team.

Early life 
Cagle was born in Tucson, Arizona, and attended Salpointe Catholic High School. She later attended Duke University and was a student-athlete on the Duke Blue Devils women's soccer team from 1992 to 1995. She appeared in 90 games and scored 47 times.

Career 
Prior to joining the Women's United Soccer Association, Bivens played for the Raleigh Wings. She was selected in the tenth round of the 2000 WUSA Draft by the Atlanta Beat as the 80th overall selection.

International 
Cagle made one appearance for the United States women's national soccer team when she was a substitute on April 19, 1994, against Trinidad and Tobago.

Coaching 
Cagle served as the head coach of the Virginia Tech Hokies women's soccer team from 2003 to 2010. She also served as an assistant coach at Texas Longhorns women's soccer and Wake Forest Demon Deacons women's soccer prior to Virginia Tech.

Career statistics

Club 
These statistics are incomplete and currently represent a portion of Cagle's career.

References

External links 
 Player profile at Women's United Soccer Association

American women's soccer players
United States women's international soccer players
1974 births
Living people
Atlanta Beat (WUSA) players
Women's association football forwards
Women's association football midfielders
Duke Blue Devils women's soccer players
Virginia Tech Hokies women's soccer coaches
American soccer coaches
Raleigh Wings players
USL W-League (1995–2015) players
Women's United Soccer Association players